Osintsev (from осина meaning aspen) is a Russian masculine surname, its feminine counterpart is Osintseva. Notable people with the surname include:

Taisiya Osintseva (1923–2008), Russian neurologist

Russian-language surnames